Yanyu mengmeng may refer to:

Fire and Rain (novel), a 1964 Taiwanese novel by Chiung Yao
The Rain of Sorrow, a 1965 Taiwanese film adaptation of the novel
Lovers Under the Rain, a 1986 Taiwanese TV adaptation of the novel

See also
Romance in the Rain, a 2001 Chinese TV adaptation of the novel